Little Ireland was a slum district of Manchester, Lancashire, England, in the early 19th century. It was inhabited from about 1827 to 1847 by poor Irish immigrants, and was south of Oxford Road railway station, enclosed by the railway line and the loop in the river.

The area was demolished to make way for the Manchester South Junction Railway line. In his book The Condition of the Working Class in England in 1844, Friedrich Engels wrote about Little Ireland, calling it a "horrid little slum". 

It is commemorated by a red plaque on 8 Great Marlborough Street, about half-way between New Wakefield Street and Hulme Street.

References

History of Manchester
Irish diaspora in England
Slums in Europe
Ethnic enclaves in the United Kingdom